The Little Red Record is an EP by the country rock band the Ozark Mountain Daredevils. The 33⅓ rpm flexi disc record was packaged and included with The Car Over the Lake Album.  It contains three outtakes from the prolific It'll Shine When It Shines sessions.

Track listing
"Establish Yourself" – 0:18
"Time Warp" – 3:13
"Journey to the Center of Your Heart" – 2:54

References

The Ozark Mountain Daredevils albums
1975 EPs
Albums produced by David Anderle
A&M Records EPs